Theatre Date was a British anthology television series that aired on BBC1 in 1969. The series aired televised broadcasts of current plays from London's West End. A total of five broadcasts were made in the series. These included: William Douglas-Home's The Secretary Bird (January 23, 1969); Ronald Millar's They Don't Grow on Trees (February 14, 1969);  Joyce Rayburn's The Man Most Likely To... (February 26, 1969); Basil Dawson and Felicity Douglas's The Crunch (October 14, 1969); and Jim Wise, George Haimsohn and Robin Miller's musical Dames at Sea (November 4, 1969).

References

External links
Theatre Date at IMDB

1969 British television series debuts
1969 British television series endings
1960s British anthology television series